The Shops at Santa Anita is a super-regional shopping mall located in Arcadia, California, adjacent to the Santa Anita Race Track, formerly known as Santa Anita Fashion Park and Westfield Santa Anita.

History
The mall opened as the Santa Anita Fashion Park on October 14, 1974, with original anchors JCPenney, The Broadway, Buffum's and J. W. Robinson's. Only Buffums was open at the mall opening and the other anchors opened gradually through 1976. The western wing was demolished and expanded in the late 1980s, completing in 1994 with a Nordstrom store replacing Buffum's. The J.W. Robinson's store became a Robinsons-May store in 1993, and The Broadway was converted into Macy's in 1996.

In 1998, Westfield America, Inc., a precursor to Westfield Group, acquired the shopping center from TrizecHahn Corporation and renamed it "Westfield Shoppingtown Santa Anita". "Shoppingtown" was dropped from the name in June 2005.

On October 1, 2004, the first phase of a planned three-phase expansion of Westfield Santa Anita opened. The $113 million phase added a new food court, a 16-screen AMC Cinema, Dave & Buster's, a Cheesecake Factory, and 30 new retailers including American Eagle Outfitters and Hollister Co.

After the 2005 Federated Stores acquisition of The May Department Stores Company, the Robinsons-May store closed in 2006 and remained largely vacant for six years.

On May 7, 2009, the $120 million second phase of the mall's expansion opened. Dubbed "The Promenade", the outdoor expansion added 30 new stores between Macy's and Nordstrom with an emphasis on upscale brands like Coach, Williams Sonoma, Talbots, and Clarks.

On November 3, 2012, Forever 21 relocated from its location on the first floor into most of the former Robinsons-May becoming an anchor tenant. The Robinsons-May store was heavily renovated and repartitioned into smaller parts to accommodate this transition.

The former Robinsons-May store was used for filming the abandoned Bloomingdale's scenes in the 2008 blockbuster Cloverfield.

In September 2013, Westfield Santa Anita hosted the first Haidilao restaurant in the US.

In May 2021, Canadian artist the Weeknd performed "Save Your Tears", a song from his fourth studio album After Hours in the parking lot of Westfield Santa Anita for his 2021 Billboard Music Awards performance.

In August 2021, the shopping center was featured in Olivia Rodrigo's "Brutal" music video.

In August 2022, the shopping center was sold for a sum of $538 million to an undisclosed buyer and rebranded from "Westfield Santa Anita" to the "Shops at Santa Anita".

Anchors

Current
JCPenney (191,240 sq ft.) (opened as original anchor August 1975)
Macy's (188,200 sq ft.) (opened as The Broadway, original anchor, November 11, 1974, became Macy's in 1996)
Nordstrom (136,334 sq ft.) (opened October 1974 as Buffums, became Nordstrom in 1991)
Forever 21 (117,000 sq. ft) (opened as original anchor J.W. Robinson's on April 19, 1976, became Robinsons-May in 1993, closed in 2006, became a Forever 21 in November 2012) 
Dave & Buster's
AMC Theatres
Bowlero (opened 2004 as Sports Chalet, closed in 2016, became Bowlero in December 2018)

Former
Borders (opened 2004, closed 2011)
Sport Chalet (opened 2004, closed 2016)

See also
Westfield Group

References

External links

Shopping malls in the San Gabriel Valley
Arcadia, California
Santa Anita
Shopping malls established in 1974